Premium-rate telephone numbers are telephone numbers that charge callers higher price rates for select services, including information and entertainment. A portion of the call fees is paid to the service provider, allowing premium calls to be an additional source of revenue for businesses. Tech support, psychic hotlines, and adult chat lines (e.g. dating and phone sex) are among the most popular kinds of premium-rate phone services.  Other services include directory enquiries, weather forecasts, competitions and ratings televoting (especially relating to television shows). Diplomatic services, such as the US Embassy in London or the UK Embassy in Washington, have also charged premium rates for calls from the general public.

Premium calls are typically routed like toll-free numbers, and service providers can be located independent of the area code. These telephone numbers are usually allocated based on a national telephone numbering plan that makes them easily distinguishable from non-premium numbers; telephone companies often offer their customers the option to block calls from these number ranges, and in some jurisdictions, are required by law to offer blocking services.

Computer criminals have used premium-rate numbers to defraud unsuspecting Internet users. One scheme involved inducing users to download a program known as a dialer that surreptitiously dialed a premium-rate number, accumulating charges on the user's phone bill without their knowledge. Another now-uncommon premium-rate scam involves television programming that induces young children to dial the number, banking on the notion that they will be unaware of the charges that will be incurred. One variant, targeted at children too young to dial a number, enticed children to hold the phone up to the television set while the DTMF tones of the number were played. This type of scam was especially popular in the late 1980s to early 1990s in the United States before tougher regulations on the 900 number business forced many of these businesses to close.

Africa

Egypt
In Egypt, premium rate numbers begin with the prefix 0900, and for mobile services it uses short numbers to call or to send SMS to(4 digits only).

South Africa
In South Africa, premium rate SMS short codes are four or five digits long, starting with either '3' or '4'. Premium rate telephone services are regulated by The Independent Communications Authority of South Africa (ICASA)

Asia

Armenia
In Armenia, premium numbers start with 900, followed by six digits.

Indonesia
In Indonesia, premium numbers begin with 0809 and are marketed by Telkom as Japati, an acronym for Jaringan Pintar Nasional (National Smart Network). Due to the number's association with adult services (Telkom's dial-up Internet service, Telkomnet Instan at 080989999 being a major exception) premium-rate phone services have come under public scrutiny and regulatory crackdown, most notably in May 2015 following rash of spam text messages enticing mobile phone users to dial them.

Japan
In Japan, premium rate telephone number service was known as "DIAL Q2" and began with the prefix 0990 followed by six digits. The digit following determined the service class. The prefix 0990-3 was for adult services. The prefixes 0990-5 and 0990-6 were used for other services. To prevent unintentional charges, subscribers may optionally register a four-digit password which is then required when accessing a premium rate service. The DIAL Q2 service ended operations in early 2013.

Korea, South
Premium rate numbers start with the prefix 060 followed by 7 or 8 digits. Some consumers do not know that numbers starting with 060 are premium rate numbers because 060 is mistaken for one of long-distance area codes in Korea (there are 062, 061 and 063). They call back when they find that they miss a call to their mobile phones from a 060 number ending up paying for just making a call.

1588-#### and 1577-#### are not premium rate numbers per se. They are used by banks, insurance companies, nationwide restaurant chains, consumer electronics companies, online shopping malls and others for customer service and delivery order. In many cases, customers calling them are charged at a long-distance rate without knowing that they are making a long-distance call.

Vietnam
Premium rate numbers start with 1900; they usually serve call-in customers but in some cases they will also receive premium rate SMS.

Taiwan
Premium rate numbers start with 0203, 0204 and 0209.

Europe

In many European countries, such as France, Germany and the United Kingdom, it was common for organisations to operate customer service lines on premium-rate numbers using prefixes that fall outside the scope of the country's premium-rate number regulations. Therefore, in contrast to North America where customer service numbers are typically free of charge to the caller, consumers in Europe often used to pay a premium above the cost of a normal telephone call. The EU Consumer Rights Directive 2011/EU/83, which came into force on 13 June 2014, was intended to eliminate this pricing model, but the law's implementation and success varies widely from country to country.

Austria
The 0900 prefix is used for premium rate numbers that charge per minute and the 0901 prefix is used for premium rate numbers that charge by call. For adult content the prefix is 0930 for per minute tariffs and 0931 for event based tariffs.

Belgium
Premium rate numbers in Belgium have the area codes 090x.
 0900, 0902, 0903, 0904 (per minute – from 0.25 to 2.00 EUR)
 0906, 0907 (adult services – per minute – from 0.25 to 2.00 EUR)
 0905, 0909 (per call – from 0.25 to 31.00 EUR)
Call limited to 10 mins.

Croatia
The 060 prefix is used for premium rate numbers in Croatia for non-erotic and 064 prefix is used for erotic services.

Czech Republic
Numbers starting with 900, 906, 909 and 976 are premium rate numbers. Other numbers beginning with "9" are allocated to certain organizations, such as 972 (Czech railways), 973 (Ministry of Defense), 974 (Ministry of Interior), 95x (other Ministries, government organizations, certain commercial subjects), 910 (VoIP nongeographic nomadic numbers).

Denmark
Premium rate numbers in Denmark have the area codes 9013, 9050 and 9055/9056. The 9013 is for helplines and chat services, the 9050 (paid per call) is for TV Call-in Shows and the 9055/9056 codes are for charitable organizations.

However, the regulation is very strict. TDC is the only carrier offering these numbers, with MCXess and kwak Telecom offering numbers internationally. The regulator can be found at http://www.itst.dk/, a shortened English regulation is available here: Short Denmark Regulation.

Finland
Numbers starting with 0100, 0200, 0202, 0209, 0300, 0600, 0700, 0750, 0751, 0752, 0753, 0757, 0759, 100, 106 and 107 are premium rate numbers. The 0700 series is for entertainment, while 0600 is for services. Several other premium codes exist, sometimes confusing consumers, who may not know if they are calling a premium number or not.

The Finnish Consumers’ Association has repeatedly denounced the use of premium rate numbers.

France

Numbers starting with 08xx (International : +33 8(...)) are special rate numbers. They range from toll free numbers (080x) to premium numbers (089x) (called Audiotel by France Telecom). There are also various moderately priced numbers (from about 0.03 to 0.15 €/minute) in the 081x and 082x ranges. Most of these numbers are not reachable from outside France.

There are also special 4 digits numbers (national speed dial) in the form of 3xxx, for which billing rules can be the ones from any 08xx number, to the provider's choice.

The split rule between different premium rate numbers is not clearly defined (premium rate information numbers and premium rate entertainment numbers).

The regulator (ARCEP, previously ART) had issued a range for Telephony over xDSL in the 087x range, which might confuse consumers, as calls to these numbers are billed as local calls nationwide. Starting 20 December 2005, these have been changed to 09xx numbers, which are dedicated to VoIP. All 087x numbers have been converted to 09xx numbers by 15 December 2008.

Germany
Dedicated premium-rate lines nowadays begin with the prefix 0900, the infamous 0190 prefix having been terminated on December 31, 2005. However, some premium services also use lines with the prefix 0137, which is supposedly reserved for planned simultaneous call-in events, such as televoting.

The digit after 0900 decides the kind of service offered, unlike 0190, where it determined the pricing. This is called offline billing and causes problems for coin telephones (where they are restricted entirely) or prepaid services. These are -1 for information, -3 for entertainment and -5 for "miscellaneous" (mostly adult entertainment). 0900-9 is reserved for dialers, which are heavily regulated, or to do payments by phone.

Greece
Premium numbers in Greece start with 901 (general purpose) and 909 (adult-only services), followed by seven digits.

Hungary
In Hungary, 06–81, 06-90 and 06-91 followed by six digits are common premium-rate numbers. SMS-based services can also use short numbers such as 1781 and 17632.

Ireland
Premium rate numbers begin with the prefix 15. These numbers provide a range of services from weather forecasting to adult dating. Adult type services shall only be provided using the access codes 1598 or 1599, with adult services of a sexual nature being restricted to the latter. Adult authentication is required from your network operator to access these numbers.

All 15x numbers have officially quoted rates, set by the prefix, although telecom providers can charge an additional fee for carrying the call. 151x numbers are charged on a per-call basis, all others on a per-minute basis. In general the prices increase as the prefix number increases, within the call type range.

Comreg is a body which monitors the premium rate services industry in Ireland. Although an independent body, it can impose sanctions, ban advertisements and ban services offered by providers. It is funded by a levy on providers.

Italy

There are many premium rate numbers, including 144 (disabled by default), 166, 892, 899, using different fares.  0878 is also a premium-rate number, reserved for polls run via telephone.

Latvia
Premium numbers are with prefix (+371) 90

Netherlands
Premium numbers in The Netherlands start with 0900 (general purpose), 0906 (erotic entertainment) and 0909 (games and lotteries) followed by four or seven digits. When one dials such a nulnegenhonderd nummer it is enforced by law that the caller gets informed about the per minute rate. The Opta is the governing body that regulates premium rate services in the Netherlands.
Starting June 2014 any 0900 number used for customer service purposes is regulated at a maximum surcharge per call of €1 on top of the normal tariff for calling.

Norway
Any telephone number starting with 82 (mostly 820/829) is charged at premium rates (82x xx xxx).

Portugal
 607 - Pull opinion, 9 tariffs up to 3.28 Eur per minute (premium rates)
 707 – Entertainment and some business (€0.25 + VAT / minute)
 760 - Fixed tariff for all calls (€0.60 + VAT per call)
 761 - Entertainment (€1 + VAT per call)
 808 – Business and marketing (cost of a local land-line call)

In Portugal, the VAT for calls is 23%, except in Madeira, where it is 22%, and in Azores, where it is 18%.

Poland
Numbers starting with 70, 30 and 40 are reserved for premium-rate services. 700, 701, 707 and 300 are "general" premium-rate services (usually charged per minute), 707 and 400 are assigned for tele-voting, mass-calls and so on (usually charged per call). Other numbers (702-706, 709, 301–309, 401-409) are reserved for future assignments. There are some other numbers in "shared costs" or "dial-up services" ranges, which are charged at a quite high rates (comparable with lower cost premium rates): 8015, 8016, 207, 208.

Effective on December 1, 2008, 300 and 400 numbers are changed into 703 and 704 respectively, freeing up the whole 30x and 40x range for the future assignments (non-premium rate). This change will allow to accumulate all the premium rate services in the 700-709 range of numbers.

Romania
Premium numbers are in the 090xxxxxx-098xxxxxx range. Currently, only the 0900 block is used. . Prior to 2002, all numbers starting with 89 were premium rate numbers. Some of those number remain as local premium numbers, and the 02xx89xxxxx block remains reserved.

Russia

809 is probably the only premium prefix.  Note that usually in Russia one needs to dial 8 before the area code, so premium numbers are usually written as 8-809-xxx-xxxx

Slovakia
The 0900 prefix is used in Slovakia for premium rate numbers.

Slovenia
The 090 prefix is used for premium rate numbers in Slovenia.

Spain
In Spain, the charged-at-premium numbers begins with 80 or 90 (except the 800, 900 and 909, which are free, the 901 which is shared cost, the 902 which is like a provincial call and the 908 which is like a metropolitan call). The most popular prefixes are 803 (porn hot-lines) and 806 (services), also are used 807 and 905. Previously all the numbers starting with 90x (except 900, 901 and 902) were charged at premium rates but the 906 had been moved to 803, 806 and 807 and the 908 and 909 prefixes were created for Internet dialup services. All those numbers have 9 digits. In Spain both pay per minute and pay per call billing options are available across the 8 and 9 series range of numbers.

Also there are other range for information services (weather, white pages, etc...), there are all the numbers starting with 118, they can have 5 or 6 digits with a variable cost per number. 11818 is free from Telefónica's telephone cabins. Previously 11818 was 1003.

Sweden
Numbers starting with 0900, 0939  and 0944 are premium rate numbers. Also numbers beginning on 118 are premium rate numbers for companies that provide phonebook lookup services.

Switzerland
Numbers starting with 0900, 0901 and 0906 are premium rate numbers.
 0900 – Business & Marketing
 0901 – Entertainment
 0906 – Erotic services

Dialers (computer programs) are banned from these lines.

See also Bundesamt für Kommunikation

Ukraine
Numbers starting with 0703 and 0900 are premium rate numbers.

United Kingdom

Premium rate numbers in the United Kingdom have a two-part call charge, following regulatory reform in July 2015. The cost of calling such numbers is always a total of the following elements:
 An 'Access Charge' which is set by the caller's own telephone company. This varies considerably by company, from 2p-15p per minute from landlines or 5p-58p per minute from mobile phones.
 A 'Service Charge' that benefits the organisation being called and/or its telecoms supplier. The same charge applies from all consumer landlines and mobile phones, with the organisation in question being responsible for informing callers of the applicable rate.

Such numbers are officially designated as 'service numbers' and fall into the following ranges:
 084x xxx xxxx - Service Charge of up to 7p per call and/or up to 65p per minute
 087x xxx xxxx - Service Charge of up to 13p per call and/or up to 65p per minute
 09xx xxx xxxx - Service Charge of up to 65p per call and/or up to £3.60 per minute

Numbers starting 098, along with legacy numbers starting 0908 and 0909 are reserved for 'adult' services with sexual content.

The Phone-paid Services Authority regulatory body monitors and enforces specific community standards in terms of content and price for Controlled Premium Rate Services (CPRS). These include:
 087, 09 and 118 numbers with a Service Charge of more than 7p per minute or per call
 all chatlines, information, connection and/or signposting services (ICSS), sexual entertainment services and internet dialler-operated services irrespective of call cost or prefix
 any 070 numbers and mobile shortcodes where the benefit passed on is more than 10p per call or per minute.

The various 08 and 09 ranges originate from telephone numbering reform in the late 1990s. Originally 09 numbers were designated as premium rate, with 0845 and 0870 numbers charged from landlines at rates that mirrored the cost of standard local and national phone calls respectively. Prior to this, a wide mix of prefixes was in use, from the well-recognized 0891 and 0898 prefixes to others such as 0331 and 0660.

Middle East

Iran
In Iran, premium rate numbers start with the prefix 909 followed by 7 digits. (909 xxx xxxx)

Israel
Numbers starting with 1–900, 1–901, 1–919, 1-956 and 1-957 are premium rate numbers.
 1-900 – Regular landline call rate + 50 Agorot (0.5 Shekel) (≈$0.14) per minute
 1-901 – Regular landline call rate + 250 Agorot (2.5 Shekels) (≈$0.7) per call
 1-919 – Erotic services
 1-956 – Entertainment services: up to 40 Agorot more than a regular landline rate + destination service provider fee
 1-957 – Information services: regular landline rate + destination service provider fee

The prefix 1-900 belongs to services with cost addition of 0.5 NIS for minute. Usually, used in radio stations and dates services. the next two digits tells the company: 2X for Bezeq, 50 for Pelephone, 52 for Cellcom (052-999XXXX in the origin), 54 for Partner (054-400XXXX in the origin) and 72 for Smile.

More optional premium call prefix:
012-409 or 018-XXX: Are used by Smile and Xphone. Cost 9.90 NIS for minute, usually for mysticism services.
013-44: Is used by Netvision. Costs 6 NIS for minute, usually for TV game.

Lebanon
Some four digit numbers are premium rate numbers. These numbers can only be reached with a mobile phone and are mainly used for contests and sweepstakes.

Saudi Arabia
The numbers starting with 700. They are mostly for competitions and winning prizes—adult entertainment ventures are considered immodest and thus illegal in Saudi Arabia.

North America

United States and Canada
A 1 (900) telephone number, in the North American Numbering Plan, has the form 1 (900) ###-####, and is often called a 900 number or a 1 900 number ("one-nine-hundred").  Area code 900 went into service January 1, 1971, but the first known to have been used in the United States for the "Ask President Carter" program in March 1977, for incoming calls to a nationwide talk radio broadcast featuring the newly elected President Jimmy Carter, hosted by anchorman Walter Cronkite. At that time, the intent for area code 900 was as a choke exchange—a code that blocked large numbers of simultaneous callers from jamming up the long-distance network. Numbers with the 900 area code were those which were expected to have a huge number of potential callers, and the 900 area code was screened at the local level to allow only a certain number of the callers in each area to access the nationwide long-distance network for reaching the destination number. Also, the early incarnation of 900 was not billed at premium-rate charges, but rather at regular long-distance charges based on the time of day and day of week that the call was placed. The number used for the radio program was one that was specially arranged by AT&T Corporation, CBS Radio, and the White House, to be free to the calling party. However, by 1980, the 900 area code was completely restructured by AT&T to be the premium-rate special area code which it remains today.  At that time, many evening news agencies conducted "pulse polls" for $0.50 per call charges and displayed results on television.  One early use was by Saturday Night Live producers for the sketch "Larry the Lobster", featuring Eddie Murphy.  The comedy sketch drew nearly 500,000 calls. AT&T and the producers of SNL split the profits of nearly $250,000.

Earlier, 976 numbers used 976 as a local prefix (970 or 540 in some markets like New York state), though it was not assigned to a specific telephone exchange like other prefixes. These numbers were dialed as any other number, such as 976–1234.

A call to either one of these numbers can result in a high per-minute or per-call charge. For example, a "psychic hotline" type of 1-900 number may charge $2.99 for the first minute and 99 cents for each additional minute.

Initially, consumers had no choice regarding the accessibility to 900/976 numbers on their phones. However, in 1987, after a child had accumulated a bill of $17,000, the California Public Utilities Commission subsequently required phone companies to give customers the option of preventing the dialing of 900/976 numbers.

From the early 1980s through the early 1990s, it was common to see commercials promoting 1 (900) numbers to children featuring such things as characters famous from Saturday morning cartoons to Santa Claus. Due to complaints from parent groups about kids not knowing the dangers and high cost of such calls, the FTC enacted new rules and such commercials directed at children ceased to air on television as of the mid-1990s.

Using 900 numbers for adult entertainment lines was a prevalent practice in the early years of the industry. This practice continues, along with the use of these numbers for things such as software technical support, banking access, and stock tips.  Adult entertainment 900 numbers have been largely absent from AT&T and MCI since 1991. In 1992, the Supreme Court allowed a law passed by Congress that created a block on all 900 numbers that provided adult content, except for those consumers who requested access to a specific number in writing. The law killed the adult 900 number business, which moved over to 800 numbers, where billing had to be done by credit card.

Hulk Hogan's Hotline was a lucrative 900 number in the 1990s. Other early leaders in amassing huge volumes of revenue were the New Kids on the Block and Dionne Warwick's Psychic Friends Network.

Consumers in the US have specific rights regarding 900 number calls, as laid down by the Federal Trade Commission, such as the right to a disclaimer at the beginning of the call and a subsequent 3-second hang-up grace period, the ability to contest billing errors, a prohibition on marketing to children, and a requirement that telecommunication companies must allow the consumer to block dialing to 900 numbers. US telephone companies are prohibited from disconnecting local service as a means to force payment for 1 (900) calls. Furthermore, in 2002, AT&T withdrew from billing their customers for the fee structures. This was followed by other companies throughout the decade until 2012, when Verizon, the final hold-out, also withdrew from passing on the charges.

Various attempts have been made by vendors to circumvent these protections by using Caribbean or other international numbers outside Federal Communications Commission jurisdiction to bill US telephone subscribers; the former +1 (809) countries were popular as their North American Numbering Plan format numbers look domestic but are not. The 101XXXX dial-around prefixes were also briefly the target of abuse by premium number providers posing as inter-exchange carriers, a practice which has now been stopped. A loophole which allowed US (but not Canadian) providers in toll-free area code 800 to bill for calls by claiming the subscriber agreed to the charges has also been largely closed by more stringent regulation.

SMS (texting) also has a feature for premium rate services. They generally do not use 900 numbers, but instead use five-digit and six-digit numbers, shorter than a telephone number.

Mexico
Premium rate numbers in Mexico are served by Telmex and start with the dialling prefix 01-900, where 01 is the domestic long-distance prefix and 900 is the premium-rate area code. These numbers are usually used for the same purposes as in the United States.

Oceania

Australia
In Australia, premium rate numbers generally begin with the prefix 19, with premium-rate voice services using the prefix  190x. Of these 1900 was the initial prefix and is the most common; since then 1901 and 1902 have also been allocated. The 1901 prefix is specifically reserved for "restricted services", where a user must register with the provider of the service on that number - these can include services of a sexual nature, although this is not the only definition of "restricted". The prefix 1906 is reserved for premium-rate paging services.

Other numbers beginning with 19 are generally used for premium rate short message service (SMS) services on mobile phones. These were originally trialled using the 188 prefix.

Previously (before the introduction of eight digit numbering), the prefix 0055 was used for this purpose, and as a result 190x numbers are occasionally referred to colloquially as 0055 numbers (pronounced double-oh, double-five).

The first digit of 1900 numbers is mainly 9; such numbers were converted from the 0055 prefix (for example, 0055 55 123 would become 1900 955 123.

New Zealand
In New Zealand, premium-rate telephone numbers begin with 0900. The service is used by phone sex companies, phone support services and for donations to charitable organizations.

South America

Argentina
Telephone numbers of the form 0600-xxx-xxxx and 0609-xxx-xxxx are premium rate numbers. The 0609 series is for entertainment (fixed rate), while 0600 is for services (the rate depends on the particular number).

Brazil
In Brazil, there is only one premium prefix: 0500, and this number is used by organizations receiving donations (it's a premium rate per call and not per minute).

In the 1990s, numbers starting with 900 were used for that purpose and later numbers starting with 0900 was available, but now is no longer allowed. As there are no longer premium numbers, TV shows now use mobile numbers to receive calls and generate revenue to their program.

For the same premium rate purpose, it is used of numbers destined to mobile phones with unusual code of selection of carriers for the purpose of charging a premium rate per minute. Ex: 0 91 41 98401–0101.

Using international-rate calls as premium-rate numbers 
As an alternative to official premium-rate numbers, service operators have been known to use kickbacks from high-rate international call tariffs to charge for their services.  In these cases, the calls may never leave the country of origin, even though the number has a country calling code (or an NANP area code) specifying a country with high incoming call rates.

A recent practice known as traffic pumping involves service operators partnering with small telephone companies who are allowed to charge high call termination fees for incoming long-distance calls, per government regulations which mark the serving area of the small phone company as rural/high cost. Since most, if not all, long distance in the US is a single rate regardless of terminating exchange for customers (but not for long-distance companies, as each interconnection agreement is different), these services are "free" for the calling customers.

Since these kinds of numbers have confused international jurisdiction, they are also sometimes used for fraud.

See also

 Telecommunications tariffs
 Premium SMS

References

Telephone numbers
Telecommunications economics